Upper German is a family of High German dialects spoken primarily in the southern German-speaking area.

History
In the Old High German time, only Alemannic and Bairisch are grouped as Upper German. In the Middle High German time, East Franconian and sometimes South Franconian are added to this. Swabian splits off from Alemannic due to the New High German diphthongisation.

Family tree
Upper German proper comprises the  Alemannic and Bavarian dialect groups. Furthermore, the High Franconian dialects, spoken up to the Speyer line isogloss in the north, are often also included in the Upper German dialect group.
Whether they should be included as part of Upper German or instead classified as Central German is an open question, as they have traits of both Upper and Central German and are frequently described as a transitional zone. Hence, either scheme can be encountered. Erzgebirgisch, usually lumped in with Upper Saxon on geographical grounds, is closer to East Franconian linguistically, especially the western dialects of Erzgebirgisch.

Roughly
Upper German is divided roughly in multiple different ways, for example in:
 North Upper German: East Franconian and South Franconian
 West Upper German: Swabian and Alemannic
 East Upper German: Bavarian (North, Middle and South Bavarian)
or:
 West Upper German: Alemannic (Low and Highest Alemannic, Swabian), East Franconian
 East Upper German: Bavarian (North, Middle and South Bavarian)
or:
 West Upper German: Alemannic in the broad sense (i.e. Alemannic in the strict sense, including Alsatian, and Swabian), South Franconian, East Franconian
 East Upper German: Bavarian (North, Middle and South Bavarian)
or writing dialects in the Early New High German times:
 West Upper German: South Franconian, Swabian, Alemannic
 East Upper German: Bavarian, East Franconian

In English there is also a grouping into:
 South Upper German: South and Middle Alemannic, South Bavarian, South Middle Bavarian "on the east bank of the Lech" – where the "state of initial consonants is largely that of Old High German"
 North Upper German: North Alemannic, North Bavarian, Middle Bavarian – which "have allegedly weaking many initial fortes"

Attempts to group East Franconian and North Bavarian together as North Upper German are not justified and were not sustainable.

Detailed

 High Franconian or Upper Franconian (German: , sometimes ), spoken in the Bavarian Franconia region, as well as in the adjacent regions  of northern Baden-Württemberg and southern Thuringia
 Main-Franconian, mainly spoken in Bavarian Franconia, in the adjacent Main-Tauber-Kreis of Baden-Württemberg, as well as in Thuringia south of the Rennsteig ridge in the Thuringian Forest
 Itzgründish, spoken in the Itz Valley
 Vogtlandish, spoken in Vogtland, Saxony [sometimes; sometimes classified as East Central German separated from Upper Franconian]
 South Franconian, spoken in the Heilbronn-Franken region of northern Baden-Württemberg down to the Karlsruhe district
 Swabian, spoken mostly in Swabia, and further separated by the sounds in the equivalents of German  'broad',  'great',  'snow'
 West Swabian: 
 Central Swabian: 
 East Swabian: 
 South Swabian: 
 Alemannic in the strict sense
 Low Alemannic
 Alsatian, spoken in Alsace, now France
  Colonia Tovar German or Alemán Coloniero, spoken in Colonia Tovar, Venezuela
 Basel German (German: ,)
 High Alemannic
 Bernese German (German: ,)
 Zurich German (German: , Zurich German:  or )
 Highest Alemannic
 Walser German or Walliser German, spoken in the Wallis Canton of Switzerland
 Bavarian (or Bavarian-Austrian, Bavarian–Austrian) (German:), spoken in the German state of Bavaria, in Austria, and in South Tyrol, Italy
 Northern Bavarian or North Bavarian, spoken mainly in the Bavarian Upper Palatinate region
 Central Bavarian (also , literally Danube Bavarian), spoken mainly in Upper and Lower Bavaria, in Salzburg, Upper and Lower Austria
 Viennese German, spoken in Vienna and parts of Lower Austria
 Southern Bavarian or South Bavarian (sometimes also , literally Alpine Bavarian), spoken mainly in the Austrian states of Tyrol, Carinthia and Styria, as well as in South Tyrol, Italy
 Gottscheerish or Granish (German: , Gottscheerish: Göttscheabarisch), spoken in Gottschee, Slovenia, nearly extinct
 Cimbrian (German: , Cimbrian: Zimbar,), spoken in the Seven Communities (formerly also in the Thirteen Communities) in Veneto, and around Luserna (Lusern), Trentino, Italy
 Mòcheno language (German: , Mòcheno: Bersntoler sproch,), spoken in the Mocheni Valley, Trentino in Italy
 Hutterite German, spoken in Canada and the United States

Other ways to group Alemannic include:
 Alemannic in the strict sense besides Swabian:
 Upper-Rhine Alemannic or Upper Rhine Alemannic ( or ): having shifted -b- between vowels to -w- and -g- between vowels to -ch-
 Lake Constance Alemannic ( or ): having soundings like broat, Goaß, Soal
 South or High Alemannic ( or )
 Alemannic in the strict sense:
 
 separated by the 
 
 
 separated by the 
 
 Alemannic in the strict sense (in the early New High German time):
 
 
 
 
 
 
 Alemannic in the broad sense including Swabian (in the Middle High German time):
 Alemannic in the broad sense:
 
 
 
  = 
 
 
 
 Alemannic in the broad sense:
 
 
 : having shifted k to kχ⁠
 
 : also having shifted k after n to kχ⁠
 Alemannic in the broad sense (with some exemplary differentiations):
 
 
 differentiated by the Early New High German diphthongisation, and also the verbal uniform plural or Einheitsplural -et/-e and the lexemes Wiese/Matte
 
 
 differentiated by shift of k (k-Verschiebung)
 
 differentiated by nasal loss before fricative, and also the inflection of predicative adjectives
 

Sometimes the dialect of the Western Lake (literally Lake Alemannic) (northern of the Bodensee) is differentiated.

Langobardic (Lombardic)
Based on the fact that Langobardic, extinct around 1000, has undergone the High German consonant shift, it is also often classified as Upper German. A competing view is that it is an open question where to place Langobardic inside of Old High German and if it is Old High German at all.

References

Upper German languages
German dialects